Keturi brūkšniai, commonly stylized as ----, is a polemical book by Lithuanian historian Edvardas Gudavičius, written in the Lithuanian language. It was published in 2002 by Aidai in Vilnius. It does not have any proper title, but publishers and book sellers usually put four dashes as the title.

References
 Gemeinsamer Verbundkatalog 
 Library of Congress

Lithuanian books
2002 non-fiction books